"Love Galore" is a song by American singer SZA, featuring vocals from American rapper and singer Travis Scott. It was released through Top Dawg Entertainment and RCA Records as the second single from SZA's debut studio album, Ctrl, on April 28, 2017. SZA and Scott wrote the song alongside TDE President Punch, and with producers Scum, Lang, and ThankGod4Cody. "Love Galore" received widespread acclaim from music critics and a Grammy nomination at the 60th Annual Grammy Awards for Best Rap/Sung Collaboration. An alternate version of the song was included on the deluxe edition of Ctrl, released on the five-year anniversary of the album's release on June 9, 2022, which features an additional verse from SZA that replaces Scott's verse.

Background and release
SZA premiered "Love Galore" during a performance on Jimmy Kimmel Live! in January 2017. The studio version of the song premiered via SZA's SoundCloud account on April 27, 2017, and the next day it was released for digital download on iTunes as a single. It is the second single from SZA's album, Ctrl, which was released on June 9, 2017.

While talking about Travis Scott in an interview with Genius, SZA said;

"I’m definitely a huge fan of Travis. I think he merges that super-fine line between melody and syncopation and pocket. And I love his pockets, and I love his note choice. He’s just gnarly. He’s perfect."

Live performances
To further promote the single following increased airplay on rhythmic and urban radio, SZA performed the song at The Tonight Show with Jimmy Fallon on July 20, 2017. She also performed the song at the 2017 BET Awards and on Saturday Night Live.

Music video
The music video for the song, directed by Nabil, premiered on April 27, 2017. It was uploaded to SZA's Vevo channel on April 28, 2017.

Personnel
Credits adapted from Tidal.

 SZA – vocals, songwriting
 Travis Scott – vocals, songwriting
 Carter Lang – production, songwriting
 ThankGod4Cody – production, songwriting
 Terrence Henderson – songwriting
 Chris Classick – engineering
 Tristan Bott – assistant engineering
 Derek "MixedByAli" Ali – mixing
 Blake Harden – recording

Charts

Weekly charts

Year-end charts

Certifications

Release history

References

2017 singles
2017 songs
SZA songs
Travis Scott songs
Songs written by Travis Scott
Songs written by SZA
Top Dawg Entertainment singles
RCA Records singles